Francis Bennett may refer to:

Francis Bennett (writer) (1887–1958), the pseudonym of Edwin Keppel Bennett
Francis Oswald Bennett (1898–1976), New Zealand doctor, military medical administrator and writer

See also
Francis Bennett-Goldney (1865–1918), British antiquary, politician and soldier
Frank Bennett (disambiguation)